Sarine Sagherian, also known as  Sarina Cross is a Lebanese-Armenian singer.

In Summer of 2017, Sarina Cross was the special guest at the concert of Matthaios and Konstantinos Tsahouridis taken place in Thessaloniki city, Greece where she performed Armenian folk songs, "Bingyol", "Ashkharum sirel em qez", "Dle Yaman", "Tamam Ashkhar", the Arabic song "Qaduka al mayas" and Greek songs such as "Ι sevda s' ki metriete".

References

1994 births
Living people
Singers from Beirut
Lebanese people of Armenian descent
Lebanese singers
Lebanese women singers
21st-century Lebanese women singers